Club Atlético Victoriano Arenas is an Argentine sports club located in the Avellaneda district of Greater Buenos Aires.  The club is mostly known for its football team, which currently plays in Primera C Metropolitana, the regionalised 4th level of Argentine football league system. Victoriano Arenas was founded on January 2, 1928, taking its name from an estate agent in Valentín Alsina. Apart from football, other disciplines hosted by the club are artistic roller skating and judo.

History 
In 1998 an historical event happened at Victoriano Arenas stadium, when Florencia Romano became the first female referee being assigned to a professional men's football match.

Victoriano Arenas and Claypole played a match in 2011 where all 22 players on the pitch and a combination of 14 subs and coaches received red cards, for a total of 36. This is the most red cards ever issued in a senior level game.

Team 2021 
october 03 of 2021

Titles
Primera D (2) : 1990–91, 2017–18

References

External links

Official website

 
Association football clubs established in 1928
1928 establishments in Argentina